The women's 400 metres at the 2016 IAAF World Indoor Championships took place on March 18 and 19, 2016.

Nigerian born Oluwakemi Adekoya, a mercenary runner for Bahrain, came into these championships as only the seventh fastest in the world this year, but she made her mark with the fastest times in each round.  In the final, she was about even with Quanera Hayes at the break, but as Hayes broke for lane 1, Adekoya made a beeline for the apex of the next turn, effectively closing the door and relegating Hayes and the rest of the field to run behind her.  Hayes gathered herself and made one big push coming around the final turn, but Adekoya was able to hold her off.  Hayes tried again coming off the turn but couldn't make any progress.  As Hayes strained for the finish, she made a second strategic mistake and allowed Ashley Spencer to pass on her inside, Spencer pipping her for the silver medal at the line.

Records

Qualification standards

Schedule

Results

Heats
Qualification: First 2 (Q) and next 4 fastest (q) qualified for the semifinals.

Semifinals
Qualification: First 3 (Q) qualified directly for the final.

Final
The final was started on March 19 at 18:47.

References

400 metres
400 metres at the World Athletics Indoor Championships
2016 in women's athletics